Jenly Tegu Wini (born 9 June 1983 in Honiara, Solomon Islands) is Solomon Islander weightlifter. She competed in the 2012 Summer Olympics at the women's 58 kg category. She was flagbearer of Solomon Islands sports team in the opening ceremony. In the event, Wini finished in 17th.

She won the 2013 Oceania Championships in her weight category, the first female weightlifter from the Solomon Islands to do so.

She also competed at the 2014 Commonwealth Games, finishing 8th in the women's 58 kg.  She was also the Solomon Islands flagbearer at this event.

She competed at the 2016 Summer Olympics in Rio de Janeiro in the women's 58 kg. She finished in 15th place. She was the flagbearer for the Solomon Islands during the opening ceremony.

In 2018 she became the first Solomon Islands athlete to win a Commonwealth Games medal, finishing third in the women's 58kg weightlifting event on the Gold Coast.

Major results

References

External links
 
 Profile

1983 births
Living people
Solomon Islands female weightlifters
Olympic weightlifters of the Solomon Islands
People from Honiara
Weightlifters at the 2012 Summer Olympics
Weightlifters at the 2016 Summer Olympics
Weightlifters at the 2010 Commonwealth Games
Weightlifters at the 2014 Commonwealth Games
Weightlifters at the 2018 Commonwealth Games
Commonwealth Games bronze medallists for the Solomon Islands
Commonwealth Games medallists in weightlifting
Weightlifters at the 2022 Commonwealth Games
Medallists at the 2018 Commonwealth Games